Jack & Coke (formerly known as SeventyEight) is a multi-platinum selling Swedish producer and songwriting team consisting of Svante Halldin and Jakob Hazell. They have produced and written songs for artists such as Rita Ora, Charli XCX, Tove Lo, Nick Jonas and Hayley Kiyoko. Both Find You with Nick Jonas and Curious with Hayley Kiyoko placed on Top 40 hits on US radio. They have also co-produced the Eurovision Song Contest winning song Euphoria with Loreen which is the most sold and played Eurovision song in history.

Songwriting and production credits

References 

Swedish songwriters